The Institute of Women (Instituto de las Mujeres, formerly Instituto de la Mujer) is a Spanish autonomous agency attached to the Ministry of Equality.  It was established in 1983, "with its main aim  ... the promotion of conditions to facilitate social equality between the sexes and the participation of women in political, cultural, economic and social life".

References

External links

Women's organisations based in Spain
Government agencies of Spain
1983 establishments in Spain